The Homestead Town Hall, also known as the Redlands District Chamber of Commerce, is the original town hall for the Town of Homestead, built in 1917 Homestead, Florida. It is located at 41 North Krome Avenue. On November 7, 1997, it was added to the U.S. National Register of Historic Places.

The building was originally two separate buildings that date to 1917 and 1924, which were subsequently connected. It was the first municipal building in Homestead.  
This property is part of the Homestead Multiple Property Submission.

The Historic Homestead Town Hall Museum is located in Homestead Town Hall.  The museum features photos, artifacts and films about the city's history.

References

External links

 Historic Homestead Town Hall Museum - Official website for museum housed in the building

City and town halls in Florida
Buildings and structures in Miami-Dade County, Florida
National Register of Historic Places in Miami-Dade County, Florida
Homestead, Florida
Museums in Miami-Dade County, Florida
City and town halls on the National Register of Historic Places in Florida
1917 establishments in Florida